Vignan Vidyalaya, Rayagada is a Central Board of Secondary Education-affiliated, English medium, pre-primary and primary children's school in Rayagada, Odisha.

About
The school was established in the year 2008 as only a play school. The day boarding school has one campus at the Main Road, Rayagada and another campus at New Colony, Rayagada.
It now has another campus at Seriguda that is named as blooms. The school management is private and unaided; it is an English Medium – co-educational school.
Vignan Vidyalaya does not have its own building and runs in a rented building. The school has total of 5 classrooms. The lowest Class is 1 and the highest class in the school is 7.

References 

Schools in Odisha
2008 establishments in Orissa